The 2022 Houston Baptist Huskies baseball team represented Houston Baptist University, now known as Houston Christian University, during the 2022 NCAA Division I baseball season. The Huskies played their home games at Husky Field and were led by first–year head coach Lance Berkman, former star player with the Houston Astros. They were members of the Southland Conference.

This was the last season for the Huskies under the Houston Baptist name. The university changed its name to Houston Christian University on September 21 of that year. The nickname of Huskies was not changed.

Preseason

Southland Conference Coaches Poll
The Southland Conference Coaches Poll is to be released in the winter of 2022.

Preseason All-Southland Team & Honors

First Team
Daunte Stuart – 2nd Base
Cal Carver – Pitcher

Second Team
Donovan Ohnoutka – Pitcher
Drayton Brown – Pitcher

Personnel

Schedule and results

References

Houston Baptist Huskies
Houston Christian Huskies baseball seasons
Houston Baptist Huskies baseball